Eugenio Calvarese (born 19 May 1992 in Alba Adriatica) is an Italian footballer who plays as a defender for ASD Alba Adriatica Calcio.

References

External links
 L'Aquila Calcio profile

1992 births
Living people
Sportspeople from the Province of Teramo
Italian footballers
Association football defenders
Delfino Pescara 1936 players
U.S. Avellino 1912 players
L'Aquila Calcio 1927 players
Paganese Calcio 1926 players
Footballers from Abruzzo